Lim Choong-Hyun (born July 20, 1983) is a South Korean football player who since 2007 has played for Daejeon Citizen (formerly Seongnam Ilhwa).

References

External links 
 

1983 births
Living people
South Korean footballers
Association football defenders
Daejeon Hana Citizen FC players